"Before You Leave" is a song by New Zealand band Six60, released as a single in August 2022 as the lead single from their album Castle St.

Background and composition

The song was inspired by the birth of the band's lead singer Matiu Walters' daughter. Her birth made Walters reframe his life, and the reasons why he creates music, and wanted to create a song that could impart "inspirational wisdom" to his daughter, even though she was too young to speak. The single was written and recorded in the band's studio in Dunedin as a live studio session, in a similar way to how the band recorded their first songs together.

Release and promotion 

"Before You Leave" was released as the lead single from Castle St on 19 August, a month and a half before the album. A music video for the song was released on the same day. In November during their visit to Auckland, Canadian pop duo Neon Dreams performed a cover of the song.

Credits and personnel
Ji Fraser – guitar, songwriting
Marlon Gerbes – keyboards, songwriting
David Kutch – mastering engineer
Raul Lopez – engineer, mixer
Chris Mac – bass, songwriting
Malay – producer, songwriting
Eli Paewai – drums, songwriting
Matiu Walters – vocals, songwriting
Simon Wilcox – songwriting
Yelawolf – songwriting

Charts

Year-end charts

Certifications

References

2022 singles
2022 songs
New Zealand songs
Six60 songs
Songs written by Malay (record producer)